Felipe Souza Campos (born 24 May 1981), sometimes known as just Felipe, is a Brazilian football player, who plays for Guarani de Palhoça.

Biography

Club career
An attacking midfielder who occupies the hole between midfield and the strikers, he joined the Wellington Phoenix prior to the 2007–08 season and signed a 9-month contract with the option of a further year at the end of that. He quickly became a crowd favourite at Wellington, showcasing skills rarely seen in the A-League. In a round 4 away clash against Sydney FC, Wellington Phoenix managed to come out victors 2–1, with Felipe Campos scoring a stunning goal.

Felipe Campos was signed by the Gold Coast Galaxy, but became a free agent after the FFA turned down the Gold Coast licence application for the Australian A-League 2008–09 season. After Australia, Felipe spent 3 weeks with Wisla Krakow in Poland, but when the transfer window closed, he went back to Brazil to play with a local club.

He was signed by the North Queensland Fury on a 2-year contract. Before joining up with North Queensland, Felipe decided to play in Saudi Arabia with Al Raed, and was released by the Fury from his 2-year contract. In June 2010, he was loaned to Al-Wehda by Al Raed.

References

External links
 CBF profile 
 

1981 births
Living people
People from Jacareí
A-League Men players
Brazilian footballers
Brazilian expatriate footballers
Expatriate footballers in Croatia
Expatriate association footballers in New Zealand
Expatriate footballers in Saudi Arabia
Brazilian expatriate sportspeople in Saudi Arabia
Association football midfielders
Associação Desportiva Cabofriense players
HNK Hajduk Split players
Northern Fury FC players
Wellington Phoenix FC players
Al-Wehda Club (Mecca) players
Al-Raed FC players
Madureira Esporte Clube players
Guarani de Palhoça players
Saudi Professional League players
Footballers from São Paulo (state)